Van Binsbergen v Bestuur van de Bedrijfvereniging voor de Metaalnijverheid (1974) Case 33/74 is an EU law case, concerning the free movement of services in the European Union.

Facts
A Dutch legal adviser transferred his residence from the Netherlands to Belgium while proceedings were taking place before a Dutch social security court for his client, Mr Van Binsbergen. Dutch law stated only those established in the Netherlands could act as legal advisers. The court asked whether article 56 had direct effect, and if the rule was compatible. UK and Ireland argued that the services article should not have direct effect.

Judgment
The Court of Justice held that TFEU article 56 did have direct effect after the expiry period. The public interest in administration of justice could be ensured by requiring an address for a service to be maintained, rather than a residence.

A requirement that the person providing the service must be habitually resident within the territory of the state where the service is to be provided may deprive Article 59 of all useful effect.

See also

 Reyners v Belgium
 European Union law

Notes

References

European Union services case law
1974 in case law
1974 in the Netherlands
Legal history of the Netherlands
Belgium–Netherlands relations